Arya Maulana Aldiartama (born 30 September 1995) is an Indonesian badminton affiliated with PMS Solo club. Previously, he was a member of Djarum club, and has joined the club in 2009.

Achievements

ASEAN University Games 
Men's doubles

Asian Junior Championships 
Boys' doubles

BWF International Challenge/Series (2 runners-up) 
Men's doubles

  BWF International Challenge tournament
  BWF International Series tournament

BWF Junior International 

Boys' doubles

  BWF Junior International Grand Prix tournament
  BWF Junior International Challenge tournament
  BWF Junior International Series tournament
  BWF Junior Future Series tournament

References

External links 
 
 

1995 births
Living people
People from Surakarta
Sportspeople from Central Java
Indonesian male badminton players